|}

The Skymas Chase is a Grade 2 National Hunt steeplechase in Ireland which is open to horses aged five years or older. It is run at Down Royal over a distance of about 2 miles and 3½ furlongs (2 miles, 3 furlongs and 120 yards, or 3,931 metres), and it is scheduled to take place each year in November.

The race was first run in 1999.  It was awarded Grade 3 status in 2003 and then raised again in 2009, to Grade 2 status. Prior to 2003 the race was run over 2 miles and 2 furlongs.

The race is named after Skymas, winner of the Queen Mother Champion Chase in 1976 and 1977, who was trained near Down Royal. It has been run under various sponsored titles since its inauguration.

Records
Leading jockey since 1999 (4 wins):
 Barry Geraghty – Killultagh Storm (2001), Moscow Flyer (2002), Splendour (2003), In Compliance (2006)

Leading trainer since 1999 (7 wins):
 Paul Nicholls – Noland (2008), Herecomesthetruth (2009), The Nightingale (2010), Kauto Stone (2011), Cristal Bonus (2012), Rolling Aces (2013), Ptit Zig (2015)

Winners since 2001

See also
 Horse racing in Ireland
 List of Irish National Hunt races

References
 Racing Post:
 

National Hunt chases
National Hunt races in Ireland
Down Royal Racecourse
Horse races in Northern Ireland
Recurring sporting events established in 1999
1999 establishments in Northern Ireland